Shaukeiwan is one of the 35 constituencies in the Eastern District, Hong Kong. The constituency returns one district councillor to the Eastern District Council, with an election every four years. It was created in the 1988 District Board election.

Shaukeiwan constituency is loosely based on central area of Shau Kei Wan with estimated population of 14,076.

Councillors represented

Election results

2010s

2000s

1990s

1980s

References

Shau Kei Wan
Constituencies of Hong Kong
Constituencies of Eastern District Council
1988 establishments in Hong Kong
Constituencies established in 1988